Priscilla Sheath Kincaid-Smith, Mrs. Fairley, AC, CBE (30 November 1926 – 18 July 2015), was an Australia-based South African physician and researcher, specializing in nephrology. She was a past President of the Royal Australasian College of Physicians (1986-1988; first woman Councillor in 1976), World Medical Association and International Society of Nephrology (1972–75).

Early life and education
Priscilla Sheath Kincaid-Smith was born in Johannesburg, 30 November 1926, and studied medical science at the University of the Witwatersrand in there. She earned her BSc (Hons) in 1946 and her BMBS (Bachelor of Medicine, Bachelor of Surgery) in 1950. She was awarded a DSc by the University of the Witwatersrand in 1979.

Career
From 1951–53, she worked at Baragwanath Hospital in Johannesburg, holding resident positions in Medicine and Surgery and Registrar in Medicine. She died on 18 July 2015 at the age of 88.

In the early 1960s, Kincaid-Smith demonstrated evidence of the links between headache powders containing phenacetin (sold as Bex and Vincent's APC in Australia) and kidney cancer, and campaigned strongly against the use of such powders. She also contributed to research on links between high blood pressure and renal malfunction. Her career also included the positions of Director of Nephrology, Royal Melbourne Hospital (1967–91); Professor of Medicine, University of Melbourne (1975–91); and Physician in Nephrology, Royal Women's Hospital, Melbourne (1976–91)

Kincaid-Smith was President of the Royal Australasian College of Physicians (1986–88), as well as past president of the World Medical Association, and International Society of Nephrology. She was a Member of the Walter and Eliza Hall Institute.

Personal life
Kincaid-Smith met Dr Ken Fairley in May 1958. They got engaged in June and married in July. They moved to Australia at the end of the year when both were aged 31. He had spent four years in London, training in cardiology with Paul Wood at the National Heart Hospital, and was just about to return to Australia when they met. They had three children, the twin boys Stephen and Christopher, who became a gastroenterologist and an infectious disease epidemiologist. Their later-born daughter, Jascenth, studied veterinary medicine and moved to the US where she worked as a manager in the pharmaceutical industry. Their offspring produced eight grandchildren.

Ken's father and all his father's four brothers were doctors. One of his uncles was Sir Neil Hamilton Fairley, famous in the field of malaria. The family was Australian-based, but Neil became professor at the Tropical School in London. His two sons also became doctors, of whom Gordon was killed by an Irish bomb in 1975.

Kincaid-Smith died on 18 July 2015, aged 88, surrounded by family at her home in Melbourne, Australia from complications following a stroke.

Awards
 14 June 1975,appointed Commander of the Order of the British Empire "for services to medicine". 
 1989, David Hume Award from the National Kidney Foundation (USA).
 1989, Companion of the Order of Australia.

References

External links
The Lancet
The Walter and Eliza Hall Institute of Medical Research Leadership webpage
Priscilla Kincaid-Smith remembered, abc.net.au, 21 July 2015.

1926 births
2015 deaths
Australian nephrologists
Australian women scientists
Companions of the Order of Australia
Commanders of the Order of the British Empire
Fellows of the Royal Australasian College of Physicians
People from Johannesburg
Medical doctors from Melbourne
South African nephrologists
University of the Witwatersrand alumni
Academic staff of the University of Melbourne
Australian women medical doctors
Australian medical doctors
Place of death missing
20th-century women scientists
South African women physicians
South African physicians